A golden shovel is a poetic form in which the last word of each line forms a second, pre-existing poem (or section thereof), to which the poet is paying homage.

It was created by Terrance Hayes, whose poem "Golden Shovel" (from his 2010 collection Lighthead) is based on Gwendolyn Brooks' "We Real Cool" (which begins with an epigraph that includes the phrase "Golden Shovel").

Writer's Digest described it as "sort of in the tradition of the cento and erasure", but with "a lot more room for creativity," while in The Kenyon Review, Dora Malech called it "a kind of reverse-acrostic variation".

Claudia Rankine noted that a golden shovel "always remains in conversation with" the poem 
on which it is based, while Don Share observed that golden shovels "can be quite different in subject, tone, and texture from the source poem, depending upon the ingenuity and imagination of the poet".

In a discussion at LitHub, Adam Levin stated that he considers it to be a "puzzle" that can "challenge" poets, and that in terms of difficulty it is comparable to sestina and pantoum.

Origin

When Hayes decided that his five-year-old son should memorize "We Real Cool", the two of them recited the poem so many times that "(o)ne night, even as [Hayes] began digging for [his] own words, Brooks kept playing in [his] head. [He] decided to string the whole poem down the page and write into it."

References

Poetic forms